Willow Glen High School is a public high school in the Willow Glen neighborhood of San Jose, California, within the San Jose Unified School District.

Athletics

Willow Glen High School has a swimming pool, a basketball court/gym and weight training room, a mini-gym that serves as a wrestling area, a baseball field, a softball field, a multi-purpose track and turf area, a sand volleyball court, and tennis courts.

Willow Glen High School Boys' Volleyball won a CCS Championship in 2009, one of the first public schools to do so in that CCS division. Also, in 2010, Willow Glen High School Football won a CCS Championship against Sequoia High School.  From 1972-1980, the boys' basketball team was coached by the notable collegiate coach Bob Burton. Willow Glen's Baseball team won a CCS championship in 2013. The Willow Glen boys' cross country team won the Division 2 CCS championship in 2010 for the first time in twenty-six years, winning again in 2019.

Performing Arts
Willow Glen High School offers music and drama courses.

Notable alumni
Bob Berry, NFL quarterback for 12 seasons, class of 1960
Anthony Canzano, Professional baseball player, class of 1965
Jeffrey Foskett, guitarist and singer for The Beach Boys
Holly Hallstrom, model on The Price Is Right
Eric Kretz, drummer for the Stone Temple Pilots
Julio Morales, professional soccer player
Sal Maccarone, Sculptor/Author
Ann Ravel, attorney
Steve Sordello, LinkedIn CFO, Class of 1987 
Nick Jennings, Director, artist, writer, producer, Class of 1983 <ref>https://en.wikipedia.org/wiki/Nick_Jennings_(artist)

References

External links
Official website
Willow Glen Football
Willow Glen Robotics Team
Willow Glen High School Drama

San José Unified School District
High schools in San Jose, California
Public high schools in California
Educational institutions established in 1950
1950 establishments in California